Indonesia's Minister of Law and Human Rights is the head of the Ministry of Law and Human Rights. The first minister was Soepomo, who took office on 19 August 1945. The current minister is Yasonna Laoly, who took office on 27 October 2014. The longest serving was Ismael Saleh, who served ten years from 19 March 1983 to 17 March 1993. The shortest serving was Marsillam Simanjuntak, who served 48 days from 2 June to 20 July 2001.

History
The position was established, along with the ministry, with the release of Law Number 2 of 1945 under the title Minister of Justice. The first minister, Soepomo, was announced on 19 August 1945,  2 days after Indonesia's independence. Soepomo had control over several branches, including the high religious court, civil courts, supreme court, and, after its formation on 1 October 1945, the prosecutor general's office. In 1946, duty over the high religious courts was given to the Minister of Religion.

Through Legal Guideline number 19 of 1964, passed on 31 October 1964, the court system was divided into four: the general courts, the religious courts, the administrative courts, and the military tribunals. In 1965, with the passing of Law Number 13 of 1965, the civil court system was declared to be divided into three levels: the lower courts, the higher courts, and the supreme court.

Duties
As the head of the Ministry of Law and Human Rights, the minister is tasked with overseeing legal and human rights matters as well as providing necessary information to the president.

Ministers

References
Footnotes

Bibliography

Law
Ministers of law and human rights of Indonesia